Soul Intent is the fifteenth studio album by R&B and jazz fusion group Pieces of a Dream issued in February 2009 on Heads Up International Records. The album reached No. 5 on Billboard Contemporary Jazz Albums chart and No. 11 on the Billboard Top Jazz Albums chart.

Track listing

Personnel

Musicians
Eddie Baccus, Jr. - Composer, Saxophone
Paul Blakemore - Mastering, Remastering
Randy Bowland - Guitar
Joe Cunningham, Tony Watson Jr. - Saxophone
David Dyson - Bass, Composer, Guitar (Bass)
Kenneth "Babyface" Edmonds, Holmer Lewis, Antonio M. Reid, Daryl Simmons, Boaz McWade Watson - Composer
Curtis Harmon - Audio Engineer, Audio Production, Composer, Drums, Engineer, Keyboards, Percussion, Producer, Programming
Robert Hoffman - Design
Rohn Lawrence - Composer, Guitar
James K. Lloyd - Audio Engineer, Audio Production, Composer, Keyboards
Dave Love - Executive Producer
Pieces of a Dream - Primary Artist
John Secoges - Photography
Bernie Sims - Audio Engineer, Audio Production, Composer, Guitar (Bass), Keyboards
Natalie Singer - Product Manager
Martin Walters - Mixing, Programming

Charts

Singles

References

2009 albums
Heads Up International albums